Jindabyne is a 2006 Australian drama film by third time feature director Ray Lawrence and starring Gabriel Byrne, Laura Linney, Deborra-Lee Furness and John Howard. Jindabyne was filmed entirely on location in and around the Australian country town of the same name: Jindabyne, New South Wales, situated next to the Snowy Mountains.

It was one of a rush of over 16 Australian cinema releases that year. Critics praised its refinement and the film is credited as a signal of Australian cinema's maturity.

The screenplay was written by Beatrix Christian, and was adapted from the late American short story writer and poet Raymond Carver's 1975 title, "So Much Water So Close to Home". The short story was the basis for a segment in Robert Altman's Short Cuts (1993). Carver's story had also been retold in music by Australian artist Paul Kelly in the song "Everything's Turning to White", on his 1989 album So Much Water So Close to Home. Kelly contributed to the score of the 2006 film as well.

Jindabyne had its world premiere at the 2006 Cannes Film Festival and its North American premiere at the 2006 Toronto International Film Festival. The film was released in Australia on 20 July 2006 and was released in the United States on 27 April 2007. Its production budget was reportedly $10.8 million.

Plot 

On an annual fishing trip, in isolated high country, Stewart (Gabriel Byrne), Carl (John Howard), Rocco (Stelios Yiakmis) and Billy (Simon Stone) find a girl's body in the river; she has been brutally murdered by Gregory (Chris Haywood), a local electrician. The girl (Tatea Reilly) turns out subsequently to be Aboriginal. The discovery shocks and confuses the men. Only the youngest of the men, Billy, understands this is a crime scene but he is ignored. The men initially suggest hiking back the following morning as it is too late in the day to safely navigate their way to their trucks. Stewart secures the girl's body by the ankle to the riverbank, so she will not drift downstream and get lost in the rapids. However, Stewart the next day goes fishing and, after catching an especially large fish, the men decide to spend the rest of the afternoon continuing their trip before informing the police in the morning.

While the men are gone, some of the men's wives (Jude and Claire) and Rocco's girlfriend (Carmel), get together socially. During their conversation, Jude (Carl's wife) reveals that their daughter died nearly two years ago, leaving them to raise their granddaughter Caylin-Calandria, who has psychological issues and towards whom Jude shows resentment. When Stewart's wife, Claire (Laura Linney) remarks that she does not think Stewart would want more children, Jude reveals that Claire had a mental breakdown after her son Tom was born and left the family for 18 months.

The men return home late Sunday night. After reporting the body to the police, they each go to their respective homes. Stewart goes home to Claire and finds her sleeping on her stomach, reminiscent of the posture of the dead body. He talks to her briefly and initiates intimacy. However, he does not disclose the find, which later causes problems when Claire finds out he left the girl's body to keep fishing.

The next morning, the police show up at Claire and Stewart's house to ask Stewart to answer some more questions. The men gather in the police station, where the police officer expresses his disgust that they would "fish over a dead body" instead of reporting it as soon as they could. Claire is stunned that Stewart would do such a thing and keeps trying to understand his reasons. The men come up with a story that Carl strained his ankle thus they could not walk back as early as they would have otherwise. Because the girl was Aboriginal, some believe the men neglected the dead girl out of racism. All of the men's businesses are vandalised in retaliation by some of the Aboriginal community, with painted slurs branding them racists. It becomes clear from this point that the western culture of a town that had to be abandoned and rebuilt on higher ground because of a dam and which is peopled by immigrants, is at odds with the ancient belief system of the local Aboriginal community.

Claire and Elissa (Billy's partner) are the only ones of the group who express any remorse and condemnation for what happened.  Jude repeatedly defends her husband Carl, while Carl argues that the girl was already dead and thus it made no difference to her whether they stayed or not. The more Claire pushes Stewart and the others to make amends, the more tensions increase in the town.

Prior to the fishing trip, Claire had begun throwing up repeatedly from morning sickness, which she hid from everyone. With her marriage unravelling, and haunted by her post-post-partum breakdown and abandonment of her first child, she inquires of a medical professional about how to get an abortion. However, she has still not gone through with it - nor revealed her pregnancy to Stewart - by the end of the film.

Despite encountering hostility from the rest of the group, Claire continues to try to reach out to the girl's family. She gathers donations to give to the girl's family for her funeral. Claire even goes to the family's home and is rebuked. She later returns to give them the money she has gathered.

Increasingly troubled that Claire continues to probe for the truth of what happened, Stewart erupts in rage one evening when Claire asks him to talk about it. The two begin fighting physically, while slinging barbs at each other about their past mistakes. The next day, after Billy and his family have left town for the coast, Stewart tells Claire - who he suspects is planning to leave him - that he will never allow her to take his son from him. Carl similarly stands up for Caylin-Calandria after Jude once again shows anger towards her, saying she cannot take her pain of losing their daughter out on their blameless granddaughter.

The next day, Claire goes to the memorial service. The rest of the men and their wives, as well as the children, show up to pay their respects, too. When Stewart apologises on behalf of the men, the girl's father throws dirt on him, spits on the ground and walks away, but there are no further objections to their presence. Stewart also asks Claire to come home.

Throughout the movie, the murdering electrician continuously pops up around the characters, and even attends the memorial service. He is never caught.

Cast

Reception

Box office 
Jindabyne grossed $400,438 in Australia and $5,643,674 internationally for a total of just over $6 million, against a production budget of 10.8 million.

Critical response 
On Rotten Tomatoes, the film has an approval rating of 65%, based on 100 reviews, and an average rating of 5.60/10. The website's critical consensus reads, "Jindabynes disparate themes may not quite cohere, but the film features fine performances from Linney and Byrne." On Metacritic the film has a score of 65% based on reviews from 30 critics, indicating "generally favorable reviews".

A. O. Scott of The New York Times wrote that "The real flaw is that the movie's best features — the aching clarity of its central performances — threaten to be lost in a wilderness of metaphor and mystification."
The Age hailed it as "easily one of the most engrossing, thoughtful, adult-oriented big-screen dramas produced in Australia for 20 years."

Festivals 
 2006 – France – Cannes Film Festival
 2006 – UK – Edinburgh International Film Festival
 2006 – Canada – Toronto International Film Festival
 2006 – Spain – Valladolid International Film Festival
 2007 – Ireland – Jameson Dublin International Film Festival

Awards 
Won:
 2006 Film Critics Circle of Australia Awards: Best Director, Best Adapted Screenplay, Best Cinematography, Best Actress in a Supporting Role (Deborra-Lee Furness).
 2006 Valladolid International Film Festival: Best Actress (Laura Linney), Best Music.
 2006 Stockholm Film Festival: Best Manuscript (by Beatrix Christian), FIPRESCI Prize for Best Film.
 2006 Aria Fine Arts Award: Best Soundtrack (Australia)
 2006 Australian Screen Sound Guild Awards: Best Achievement in Sound for Film Sound Recording, Best Achievement in Sound for Film Sound Mixing, Feature Film Soundtrack of the Year.
 2006 Edinburgh Film Festival: Herald Angel Award
Nominated:
 2006 Australian Film Institute Awards: Best Film, Best Direction, Best Adapted Screenplay, Best Cinematography, Best Sound, Best Original Music Score, Best Actor in a Lead Role (Gabriel Byrne), Best Actress in a Lead Role (Laura Linney), Best Actress in a Supporting Role (Deborra-Lee Furness).
 2006 IF Awards: Best Director, Best Actress (Laura Linney), Best Actor (Gabriel Byrne), Best Cinematography.
 2006 Film Critics Circle of Australia Awards: Best Film, Best Actress in a Lead Role (Laura Linney), Best Actor in a Supporting Role (John Howard), Best Music Score.
 2006 Valladolid International Film Festival: Golden Spike (Ray Lawrence).
 2006 Australian Screen Sound Guild Awards: Best Achievement in Sound For Film Sound Recording, Best Achievement in Sound for Film Sound Design, Best Achievement in Sound for Film Sound Mixing, Feature Film Soundtrack of the Year.

Soundtrack 
A soundtrack was released by Capitol Records in 2006. At the ARIA Music Awards of 2006 the soundtrack won the ARIA Award for Best Original Soundtrack, Cast or Show Album.

Track listing
 "Rocks"
 "Jindabyne Fair"
 "Body Drop"
 "Claire On The Road"
 "Mirror"
 "Morning Fishing"
 "Stewart And Claire"
 "Power Lines"
 "Nukkanya"
 "Night River"
 "So Soft"
 "Going to Susan's"
 "Welcome Dance"
 "Way That I Love You"
 "Humming Way"
 "Troitsa Bratya"
 "Everything's Turning to White"

References

External links 
 Jindabyne official website
 
 The Director Interviews: Ray Lawrence, Jindabyne at Filmmaker Magazine
 Jindabyne at the National Film and Sound Archive

ARIA Award-winning albums
Australian drama films
Films based on short fiction
2006 films
Films directed by Ray Lawrence
Films scored by Paul Kelly (Australian musician)
Sony Pictures Classics films
Roadshow Entertainment films
Films set in New South Wales
2006 drama films
2000s English-language films

es:Jindabyne
nl:Jindabyne